Yugawaralite is a clear or pinkish mineral of the Zeolite group. It was first described by Sakurai and Hayashi (1952) near a waterfall by some hot springs near Yugawara.

Etymology 
Yugawaralite is named after the town Yugawara, where it was found.

Location 
Yugawaralite is found in Japan, India, and other locations. In Japan, yugawaralite is found on Honshu, where Yugawara is the type locality. In India, it is found in small amounts. Other locations where it has been found is Washington, Alaska, Yellowstone National Park, British Columbia, Iceland, Sardinia, and Reunion island.

In Alaska 
In Alaska, yugawaralite is found about 40 miles east of Fairbanks, Alaska. In this site, yugawaralite has been recorded up to 8 millimeters long.

References 

Zeolites
Minerals
Monoclinic crystals